In applied mathematics, the name finite pointset method  is a general approach for the numerical solution of problems in continuum mechanics, such as the simulation of fluid flows. In this approach (often abbreviated as FPM) the medium is represented by a finite set of points, each endowed with the relevant local properties of the medium such as density, velocity, pressure, and temperature.

The sampling points can move with the medium, as in the Lagrangian approach to fluid dynamics or they may be fixed in space while the medium flows through them, as in the Eulerian approach. A mixed Lagrangian-Eulerian approach may also be used.  The Lagrangian approach is also known (especially in the computer graphics field) as particle method.

Finite pointset methods are meshfree methods and therefore are easily adapted to domains with complex and/or time-evolving geometries and moving phase boundaries (such as a liquid splashing into a container, or the blowing of a glass bottle) without the software complexity that would be required to handle those features with topological data structures.  They can be useful in non-linear problems involving viscous fluids, heat and mass transfer, linear and non-linear elastic or plastic deformations, etc.

Description
In the simplest implementations, the finite point set is stored as an unstructured list of points in the medium.  In the Lagrangian approach the points move with the medium, and points may be added or deleted in order to maintain a prescribed sampling density.  The point density is usually prescribed by a smoothing length defined locally. In the Eulerian approach the points are fixed in space, but new points may be added where there is need for increased accuracy.  So, in both approaches the nearest neighbors of a point are not fixed, and are determined again at each time step.

Advantages
This method has various advantages over grid-based techniques; for example, it can handle fluid domains, which change naturally, whereas grid based techniques require additional computational effort. The finite points have to completely cover the whole flow domain, i.e. the point cloud has to fulfill certain quality criteria (finite points are not allowed to form “holes” which means finite points have to find sufficiently numerous neighbours; also, finite points are not allowed to cluster; etc.).

The finite point cloud is a geometrical basis, which allows for a numerical formulation making FPM a general finite difference idea applied to continuum mechanics. That especially means, if the point reduced to a regular cubic point grid, then FPM would reduce to a classical finite difference method. The idea of general finite differences also means that FPM is not based on a weak formulation like Galerkin’s approach. Rather, FPM is a strong formulation which models differential equations by direct approximation of the occurring differential operators. The method used is a moving least squares idea which was especially developed for FPM.

History
In order to overcome the disadvantages of the classical methods many approaches have been developed to simulate such flows (Hansbo 92, Harlow et al. 1965, Hirt et al. 1981, Kelecy et al. 1997, Kothe at el. 1992, Maronnier et al. 1999, Tiwari et al. 2000). A classical grid free Lagrangian method is Smoothed Particle Hydrodynamics (SPH), which was originally introduced to solve problems in astrophysics (Lucy 1977, Gingold et al. 1977).

It has since been extended to simulate the compressible Euler equations in fluid dynamics and applied to a wide range of problems, see (Monaghan 92, Monaghan et al. 1983, Morris et al. 1997). The method has also been extended to simulate inviscid incompressible free surface flows (Monaghan 94). The implementation of the boundary conditions is the main problem of the SPH method.

Another approach for solving fluid dynamic equations in a grid free framework is the moving least squares or least squares method (Belytschko et al. 1996, Dilts 1996, Kuhnert 99, Kuhnert 2000, Tiwari et al. 2001 and 2000). With this approach boundary conditions can be implemented in a natural way just by placing the finite points on boundaries and prescribing boundary conditions on them (Kuhnert 99). The robustness of this method is shown by the simulation results in the field of airbag deployment in car industry. Here, the membrane (or boundary) of the airbag changes very rapidly in time and takes a quite complicated shape (Kuhnert et al. 2000).

Tiwari et al. (2000) performed simulations of incompressible flows as the limit of the compressible Navier–Stokes equations with some stiff equation of state. This approach was first used in (Monaghan 92) to simulate incompressible free surface flows by SPH. The incompressible limit is obtained by choosing a very large speed of sound in the equation of state such that the Mach number becomes small. However, the large value of the speed of sound restricts the time step to be very small due to the CFL-condition.

The projection method of Chorin (Chorin 68) is a widely used approach to solve problems governed by the incompressible Navier–Stokes equation in a grid based structure. In (Tiwari et al. 2001), this method has been applied to a grid free framework with the help of the weighted least squares method. The scheme gives accurate results for the incompressible Navier–Stokes equations. The occurring Poisson equation for the pressure field is solved by a grid free method. In (Tiwari et al. 2001), it has been shown that the Poisson equation can be solved accurately by this approach for any boundary conditions. The Poisson solver can be adapted to the weighted least squares approximation procedure with the condition that the Poisson equation and the boundary condition must be satisfied on each finite point. This is a local iteration procedure.

Software
 Nogrid points
 MESHFREE

References

Ash N., Poo J. Y., Coalescence and separation in binary collisions of liquid drops, J. Fluid Mech., vol. 221, 1990, p. 183 - 204. 
Chorin A., Numerical solution of the Navier-Stokes equations, J. Math. Comput,. vol. 22, 1968, p. 745-762. 
Dilts G. A., Moving least squares particle hydrodynamics. I: consistency and stability, Hydrodynamics methods group report, Los Alamos National Laboratory, 1996
Gingold R. A., Monaghan J. J., Smoothed particle hydrodynamics: theory and application to non-spherical stars, Mon. Not. R. Astron. Soc., vol. 181, 1977, p. 375-389. 
Ginzburg I., Wittum G., Two-phase flows on interface refined grids modeled with VOF, staggered finite volumes, and spline interpolants, J. Comput. Phys.,. vol. 166, 2001, p. 302-335.
Hansbo P., The characteristic streamline diffusion method for the time dependent incompressible Navier-Stokes equations, Comp. Meth. Appl. Mech. Eng., vol. 99, 1992, p. 171-186.
Harlow F. H., Welch J. E., Numerical study of large amplitude free surface motions, Phys. Fluids, vol.8, 1965, p. 2182.
Hirt C. W., Nichols B. D., Volume of fluid (VOF) method for dynamic of free boundaries, J. Comput. Phys., vol. 39, 1981, p. 201.
Kelecy F. J., Pletcher R. H., The development of free surface capturing approach for multi dimensional free surface flows in closed containers, J. Comput. Phys., vol. 138, 1997, p. 939.
Kothe D. B., Mjolsness R. C., RIPPLE: A new model for incompressible flows with free surfaces, AIAA Journal, Vol. 30, No 11, 1992, p. 2694-2700. 
Kuhnert J., General smoothed particle hydrodynamics, Ph.D. thesis, Kaiserslautern University, Germany, 1999.
Kuhnert J., An upwind finite pointset method for compressible Euler and Navier-Stokes equations, preprint, ITWM, Kaiserslautern, Germany, 2000.
Kuhnert J., Tramecon A., Ullrich P., Advanced Air Bag Fluid Structure Coupled Simulations applied to out-of Position Cases, EUROPAM Conference Proceedings 2000, ESI Group, Paris, France
Landau L. D., Lifshitz E. M., Fluid Mechanics, Pergamon, New York, 1959. 
Lafaurie B., Nardone C., Scardovelli R., Zaleski S.,  Zanetti G., Modelling Merging and Fragmentation in Multiphase Flows with SURFER, J. Comput. Phys., vol. 113, 1994, p. 134 - 147. 
Lucy L. B., A numerical approach to the testing of the fission hypothesis, Astron. J., vol. 82, 1977, p. 1013. 
Maronnier V., Picasso M., Rappaz J., Numerical simulation of free surface flows, J. Comput. Phys. vol. 155, 1999, p. 439.
Martin J. C., Moyce M. J., An experimental study of the collapse of liquid columns on a liquid horizontal plate, Philos. Trans. Roy. Soc. London, Ser. A 244, 1952, p. 312.
Monaghan J. J., Smoothed particle hydrodynamics, Annu. Rev. Astron. Astrop, vol. 30, 1992, p. 543-574.
Monaghan J. J., Simulating free surface flows with SPH, J. Comput. Phys., vol. 110, 1994, p. 399.
Monaghan J. J., Gingold R. A., Shock Simulation by particle method SPH, J. Comput. Phys., vol. 52, 1983, p. 374-389. 
Morris J. P., Fox P. J., Zhu Y., Modeling Low Reynolds Number Incompressible Flows Using SPH, J. Comput. Phys., vol. 136, 1997, p. 214-226.
Tiwari S., Kuhnert J., Grid free method for solving Poisson equation, Berichte des Fraunhofer ITWM, Kaiserslautern, Germany, Nr. 25, 2001.
Tiwari S., Kuhnert J., Finite pointset method based on the projection method for simulations of the incompressible Navier-Stokes equations, M. Griebel, M. A. Schweitzer (Eds.), Springer LNCSE: Meshfree Methods for Partial Differential Equations, Springer-Verlag, Berlin, 26, 2003, p. 373-387.
Tiwari S., Kuhnert J., Particle method for simulations of free surface flows, preprint Fraunhofer ITWM, Kaiserslautern, Germany, 2000.
Tiwari S., A LSQ-SPH approach for compressible viscous flows,Hyperbolic Problems: Theory, Numerics, Applications: Eighth International Conference in Magdeburg, February/March 2000, Volume II (International Series of Numerical Mathematics), Vol. 141, 2000, 901-910.
Tiwari S., Manservisi S., Modeling incompressible Navier-Stokes flows by LSQ-SPH, Berichte des Fraunhofer ITWM, Kaiserslautern, Germany, 2000.

Numerical differential equations
Computational fluid dynamics